India competed at the 2011 World Championships in Athletics from August 27 to September 4 in Daegu, South Korea.
A team of 8 athletes was
announced to represent the country
in the event.

Tintu Luka reached the semifinal of the 800m race in which she came 6th and could not qualify for the final but she managed to clock her season's best timing and qualified for the 2012 London olympics. Vikas Gowda managed to hurl the discus to 64.05m giving him 7th place in the overall discus throw competition. Mayookha johny reached the final of the long jump event.

Results

(q - qualified, NM - no mark, SB - season best)

Men

Women

Nations at the 2011 World Championships in Athletics
2011 in Indian sport
2011